Selune  may refer to:

 Sélune, a French river
 Selûne, a fictional deity in the Forgotten Realms

See also

 Selane